Borpu is a village in Donka Tehsil, Karbi Anglong district in the Indian state of Assam.  It had a population of 403 people (2011 Census) in a total of 77 houses.  Of these inhabitants, 200 were males, 203 females.  There were 69 children.

Geographical coordinates: 26.11N and 91.83E. The village's area is 

Postal pin code is 782450.

Links 
 2011 census data
 village.org.in
 Map

Villages in Karbi Anglong district